Samih K. Farsoun, (1937 in Haifa, Palestine – June 9, 2005) was a professor emeritus of sociology at American University, where he taught for thirty years until his retirement in 2003. He graduated from Hamilton College in New York. He received a master's degree in 1961 and a PhD in 1971, both in sociology from the University of Connecticut.  He died June 9 of a heart attack while on a walk with his wife in New Buffalo, Michigan. He was a resident of Florida and Washington, D.C. During his career at AU, Farsoun served as chairman of the Department of Sociology for eleven years, chairman and member of numerous university-wide committees. He also established (with John Willoughby) the Arab Studies minor in the Sociology department in 2001.

He was the founding dean of the College of Arts and Sciences at the newly established American University of Sharjah in the United Arab Emirates from 1997 to 1999. In 2004, Farsoun was named founding dean of Academic Affairs and the College of Arts and Sciences at the newly established American University of Kuwait, where he served until February.

An activist and mentor to young Arab-Americans, Farsoun was a founding member of several organizations and the author or editor of several books and numerous other writings on varied aspects of the Arab world, Third World development and the political economy of the Middle East. He lectured at numerous conferences and provided commentary on radio and television news shows on the Middle East.

He served as a founding member and president of the Association of Arab American University Graduates; founding member of the Arab Sociological Association.
He was editor of Arab Studies Quarterly;
a member of the International Advisory Board of the Holy Land Studies: A Multidisciplinary Journal;
a founding fellow of the Middle East Studies Association of North America;
board member of Partners for Peace, formerly the American Alliance for Palestinian Human Rights in Washington, D.C.;
and board member of the Middle East Children's Alliance in Berkeley, California.

Farsoun was one of the first members of the board of directors of the Jerusalem Fund for Education and Community Development and first member of the executive committee of the Center for Policy Analysis on Palestine, now the Palestine Center, both based in Washington. He was a founding member of the Trans-Arab Research Institute in Boston.

Farsoun was married to Katha Kissman and his daughter was Rouwayda Farsoun, an adoptee from the Palestinian refugee camp Tel Zatar in Lebanon.

Works 
Farsoun wrote several books about the sociology and politics of the Middle East:
 "Palestine and the Palestinians" (1997), an updated Arabic edition of the book was published in Beirut in 2003.
 "Culture and Customs of the Palestinians" (2004). An updated second edition of "Palestine and the Palestinians" (2006) co-authored with Naseer Aruri is now available by Westview Press.

Additionally, he published more than 75 papers, book chapters and articles. His works have been translated into several languages, including Arabic, Persian, French, Italian and German. Farsoun also published numerous columns in Arabic and English journals and newspapers.

External links 
 Samih Farsoun obituary

1937 births
2005 deaths
American sociologists
Palestinian emigrants to the United States
University of Connecticut alumni
American University faculty and staff
Islam and politics
Middle Eastern studies in the United States
Hamilton College (New York) alumni
Palestinian academics
Academic staff of the American University of Sharjah
Academic staff of the American University of Kuwait